The 1958 Polish Speedway season was the 1958 season of motorcycle speedway in Poland.

Individual

Polish Individual Speedway Championship
The 1958 Individual Speedway Polish Championship was held on 31 August at Rybnik.

Team

Team Speedway Polish Championship
The 1958 Team Speedway Polish Championship was the 11th edition of the Team Polish Championship.

First League 

Medalists

Second League 

Before season, KKS Katowice was dissolved.

Third League

References

Poland Individual
Poland Team
Speedway